Red Garters may refer to:

 Red Garters (film), a 1954 musical starring Rosemary Clooney
 Red Garters (album), a soundtrack album from the film
 "Red Garters" (song), the title song from the film and album, popularized by Rosemary Clooney

See also 
 Red Garter Casino, a hotel and casino in Nevada, U.S.